The name Emang was used for ten tropical cyclones worldwide: nine times by the Philippine Atmospheric, Geophysical and Astronomical Services Administration (PAGASA) in the Western Pacific, and once by the Météo-France in the South-West Indian Ocean.

In the Western Pacific Ocean:
 Typhoon Kit (1966) (T6604, 04W, Emang) – a strong early-season typhoon which hit Japan, resulting to 64 deaths.
 Severe Tropical Storm Ruby (1970) (T7004, 04W, Emang) – high-end tropical storm that made landfall in the Philippines and China before becoming extratropical.
 Tropical Depression Emang (1974) – a system only recognized by PAGASA.
 Typhoon Wendy (1978) (T7808, 08W, Emang) – a relatively strong typhoon which hit Japan.
 Severe Tropical Storm Winona (1982) (T8208, 09W, Emang) – crossed the Philippines and China, causing minor damage.
 Tropical Storm Owen (1986) (T8606, 06W, Emang) – a short-lived tropical storm which remained at sea during its lifespan. 
 Severe Tropical Storm Tasha (1990) (T9009, 10W, Emang) – a damaging tropical storm which brought major flooding to China, killing at least 108.
 Severe Tropical Storm Russ (1994) (T9403, 05W, Emang) – another destructive tropical storm that devastated China, claiming at least 74 lives.
 Typhoon Todd (1998) (T9806, 10W, Emang) – strong but short-lived typhoon which affected Japan, causing 6 fatalities. 

In the South-West Indian Ocean:
 Moderate Tropical Storm Emang (2013) – a weak tropical storm which affected no land areas.

Pacific typhoon set index articles
South-West Indian Ocean cyclone set index articles